The Marubi Academy of Film and Multimedia is a school that offers professional, creative, artistic and technical qualifications and education for students who aspire to get involved in the Film and Television Industry in the Republic of Albania. The academy was created per Government decree in 2004, and has students from Serbia, Montenegro, North Macedonia and Albania.

The founder and rector of AFMM is well known Albanian director Kujtim Çashku.

References

External links
AFMM website

See also
List of universities in Albania
List of colleges and universities
List of colleges and universities by country

Film schools in Albania
Mass media in Tirana
Universities in Albania
Education in Tirana
Educational institutions established in 1999
1999 establishments in Albania